Events from the year 1951 in Denmark.

Incumbents
 Monarch – Frederick IX
 Prime minister – Erik Eriksen

Events
 23 January  The hospital ship MS Jutlandia departs from Copenhagen, bound for Jorea.

Sports

Badminton
 711 March  All England Badminton Championships
 Aase Schiøtt Jacobsen wins gold in Women's Single at the All England Badminton Championships.
 Tonny Ahm and Kirsten Thorndahl wins gold in Women's Double
 Poul Holm and Tonny Ahm win gold in Mixed Fouble

Date unknown
 Kay Werner Nielsen (DEN) and Oscar Plattner (SUI) win the Six Days of Copenhagen sox-day track cycling race.

Births
 12 May – Jacob Groth, film score composer
 25 July – Frank Aaen, politician

Deaths
 6 April – Marie-Sophie Nielsen, communist leader and founding member of the Danish Socialist Workers Party and the Communist Party of Denmark (born 1875)
 28 June – Thora Daugaard, women's rights activist, pacifist, editor and translator (born 1874)
 19 August – Christian Geisler, organist and composer (born 1869)
 23 September – Erik Arup, historian (born 1876)

References

 
Denmark
Years of the 20th century in Denmark
1950s in Denmark
1951 in Europe